Sigrid Amanda Evangelina Aasa Dernbrant, (born 14 October 1996) is a Swedish singer and songwriter.

Dernbrant was born in Umeå. After participating in Idol 2014 which was broadcast on TV4, she was contacted by the record label Dreamhill music label and released the debut music single "Wrong Chemistry". Aasa then toured with Miss Li. After her record deal leap out she started studying songwriting and producing at Musikmakarna.

Aasa participated in Melodifestivalen 2020 with the song "Late".

Discography

Singles

References 

Living people
People from Umeå
1996 births
Swedish women singers
Melodifestivalen contestants of 2020